All That's Not Worth Love (French: Tout ça ne vaut pas l'amour) is a 1931 French comedy drama film directed by Jacques Tourneur and starring Marcel Lévesque, Jean Gabin and Josseline Gaël.

It was shot at Pathé's Joinville Studios in Paris. The film's sets were designed by the art director Lucien Aguettand.

Synopsis
A pharmacist who up to this point has only ever shown an interest in stamp collecting gives shelter to a poor young woman and falls in love with him. However she is more interested in the salesman in the shop next door.

Cast
 Marcel Lévesque as Jules Renaudin 
 Jean Gabin as Jean Cordier
 Josseline Gaël as Claire 
 Mady Berry as Madame Cordier 
 Jane Loury as Léonie 
 Delphine Abdala as Madame Triron
 Anthony Gildès as Le tailleur 
 Léon Larive as Le client de la pharmacie
 Gilberte Savary as La petite fille

References

Bibliography 
 Harriss, Joseph. Jean Gabin: The Actor Who Was France. McFarland, 2018.

External links 
 

1931 films
French comedy films
French black-and-white films
1931 comedy films
1930s French-language films
Films shot at Joinville Studios
Films directed by Jacques Tourneur
Pathé films
1930s French films